La Vega High School is a public high school located in the city of Bellmead, Texas, United States and classified as a 4A school by the University Interscholastic League (UIL).  It is a part of the La Vega Independent School District located in central McLennan County and also includes students from Waco. When the school opened, only white students were allowed to attend. In 1970,  federally mandated integration caused African-American students from Carver High School to be rezoned to La Vega.  In 2015, the school was rated "Met Standard" by the Texas Education Agency.

Athletics
The La Vega Pirates compete in these sports 

Volleyball, Cross Country, Football, Basketball, Powerlifting, Soccer, Track, Baseball & Softball

State Titles
Boys Basketball
2000(3A)
Girls Basketball
2014(3A), 2023(4A)
Boys Track
2019(4A)
2021(4A)
Girls Track
1995(3A)
Football -
2015(4A/D1) - defeated Argyle in the state championship 33-31 to finish the season 16-0.
2018(4A/D1) - defeated Liberty Hill in the state championship 35-21 to finish the season 14-2.

State Finalist
Girls Basketball
1994(3A)
Football
1951(1A)
2008(3A/D1)
2019(4A/D1)

Notable alumni
Julia Penny Clark, labor lawyer
Beasley Reece, former NFL football player
Arthur Rhodes, former MLB pitcher 1991-2011
Dax Swanson, NFL football player

References

External links
La Vega ISD website

Public high schools in Texas
Schools in McLennan County, Texas